XHFAMA-FM is a radio station on 97.5 FM in Ciudad Camargo, Chihuahua. The station is known as La Grandota/Radio Fama.

History
XHFAMA began as XECC-AM 960, with a concession awarded on April 27, 1950 to Hugo Piñera Limas. The station moved to 560 in the 1990s before migrating to FM.

The callsign change to XEFAMA occurred in 2000, alongside the station's sale to Muñoz Muñoz. It migrated to FM in 2011 and was approved to relocate its transmitter and increase its station class in 2018.

References

External links
La Grandota 97.5 fm Facebook

Radio stations in Chihuahua